The 2013–14 Oklahoma State Cowboys basketball team represented Oklahoma State University in the 2013–14 NCAA Division I men's basketball season. This was head coach Travis Ford's sixth season at Oklahoma State. The Cowboys were members of the Big 12 Conference and played their home games at the Gallagher-Iba Arena. They finished the season 21–13, 8–10 in Big 12 play to finish in eighth place. They advanced to the quarterfinals of the Big 12 tournament where they lost to Kansas. They received an at-large bid to the NCAA tournament where they lost to Gonzaga in the second round.

Recruits

Roster
Source

Schedule and results
Source

|-
!colspan=9 style="background:#000000; color:#FF6600;"| Exhibition

|-
!colspan=9 style="background:#000000; color:#FF6600;"| Non-conference regular season

|-
!colspan=9 style="background:#000000; color:#FF6600;"|Conference regular season

|-
!colspan=9 style="background:#000000; color:#FF6600;"| Big 12 tournament

|-
!colspan=9 style="background:#000000; color:#FF6600;"| NCAA tournament

CSN = Cowboy Sports Network. The Cowboy Sports Network is affiliated with Fox Sports Net. Games could air on Fox Sports Oklahoma, Fox Sports Oklahoma Plus, Fox Sports Southwest, Fox Sports Southwest Plus, or Fox College Sports.

Rankings

*AP does not release post-tournament rankings

See also
2013–14 Oklahoma State Cowgirls basketball team

References

Oklahoma State Cowboys basketball seasons
Oklahoma State
Oklahoma State
2013 in sports in Oklahoma
2014 in sports in Oklahoma